The extended hemispherical lens is a commonly used lens for millimeter-wave electromagnetic radiation. Such lenses are typically fabricated from dielectric materials such as Teflon or silicon. The geometry consists of a hemisphere of radius  on a cylinder of length , with the same radius.

Scanning performance 

 
This relation is used when designing focal plane arrays to be used with the extended hemispherical lens.

See also 
 Luneburg lens
 Fresnel lens
 Lens antenna

References 

Geometrical optics
Lenses
Antennas (radio)